Nellanad  is a village in Thiruvananthapuram district in the state of Kerala, India.

Demographics
 India census, Nellanad had a population of 24593 with 11746 males and 12847 females.

References

Villages in Thiruvananthapuram district